Terminus is a monologue play by Mark O'Rowe.  Written entirely in rhyme, the play follows three characters over the course of a single night in Dublin: a former schoolteacher (A), her lonely, estranged daughter (B), and a serial killer who has sold his soul to the Devil (C).

Terminus premiered at the Abbey Theatre in Dublin on 9 June 2007, before transferring to the Traverse Theatre as part of the Edinburgh Fringe Festival where it won a Fringe First Award in 2008. It was revived by the Abbey in 2009 and again in 2011 with an international tour.

Original cast  
 Andrea Irvine as A
 Eileen Walsh as B
 Aidan Kelly as C

2011 Revival Cast 
 Olwen Fouéré as A
 Catherine Walker as B
 Declan Conlon as C

References

2007 plays
Irish plays